The Kirsten Flagstad Prize is awarded to outstanding Norwegian singers by the Flagstad Society. The Flagstad Society was founded by Torstein Gunnarson and Øystein Gaukstad in connection with the Norwegian soprano Kirsten Flagstad's 80th birthday in 1975, aiming to spread knowledge about Kirsten Flagstad's art and keep her name alive.

Winners 
1991 Bodil Arnesen, soprano
1992 Njål Sparbo, baritone
1993 , soprano
1995 , soprano
1997 , tenor
1997 , soprano
2002 , soprano
2004 Turid Karlsen, soprano
2006 Itziar Martinez Galdos, soprano
2007 , mezzo-soprano
2009 Ingunn Kilen, mezzo-soprano
2011 Yngve Søberg, baritone
2013 Rachel Willis-Sørensen, soprano
2015 Lise Davidsen, soprano
2020 , soprano

References 

Norwegian music awards
Classical music awards
Awards established in 1991
Opera competitions